Cychrus morawitzi is a species of ground beetle in the subfamily of Carabinae. It was described by Gehin in 1863.

References

morawitzi
Beetles described in 1863